Pouri Banayi (born Seddigheh Banayi , 11 October 1940) is an Iranian actress. She acted in more than 85 feature films between 1965 and 1979. During her years of acting before the Iranian revolution, she worked  with directors such as Mehdi Reisfirooz, Samuel Khachikian, Masoud Kimiai, Farrokh Ghaffari, and Fereidoun Goleh. Her most  memorable performances are in Iranian new wave films such as  Masoud Kimiai's Qeysar in 1969 and Fereydun Gole's The Mandrake.

She also acted in some foreign films such as Missile X: The Neutron Bomb Incident directed by Leslie H. Martinson in which she co-starred with Peter Graves. In another film directed by Fereydun Gole, named The Moon and a Murmur (1977), she co-starred with John Ireland and Mickey Rooney. Jean Negulesco chose her and Behrouz Vosoughi to play the roles of a couple in his last film The Invincible Six (1970).  Jun'ya Sato, the Japanese director chose her for the lead actress in his 1973 adaptation of the manga, Golgo 13.

Life and career
She was born Seddigheh Banayi (in Persian: صدیقه بنایی)  in Arak, Iran. She lived there for four years. She has six sisters: Mary, Akram (Aki), Ashie, Eshie, Massoumeh and Nassarin, all of whom live in California, and one brother, Mohammed, living in Tehran.

Her first feature film was The Foreign Bride, directed by Nosratollah Vahdat. Pouri didn't have any academic education in acting and because Vahdat was a distant relative, he suggested to her to act in his film.  In 1967 she co-starred with Behrouz Vosoughi, who was a famous Iranian actor at the time. They cooperated in many films and in 1970 they appeared together in Qeysar, known as one of the major films and a symbol of Iranian new wave. She also co-starred with other superstars of the time such as: Mohammad Ali Fardin, Naser Malek Motiee, Manouchehr Vosugh, Iraj Ghaderi, Ali Nasirian, and Parviz Sayyad. Most of the Iranian movies were dubbed in those days and famous actors and actresses had specific dubbers. Zhaleh Kazemi was Pouri Banayi's dubber. Some of her films, like The Mandrake and The Falconet, in addition to Qeysar and Ghazal are considered milestones in performances of before revolution Iranian cinema.

Foreign and bilateral films
She participated in some foreign and common films during her career, including Leslie H. Martinson's 1978 film, Missile X: The Neutron Bomb Incident; Fereydun Goleh's 1977 film, The Moon and a Murmur, made in the US and Iran; Jean Negulesco's last film, The Invincible Six in 1970;  Jun'ya Satō's 1973 adaptation of Golgo 13, which was a joint production of Iran and Japan; and some Turkish films such as Ah bu gençlik (Oh, youth), Tek basina (Loneliness) and Tövbekar (The Regretful).

After 1979 Revolution
Many Iranian actors and actresses left Iran after the 1979 revolution. Although Pouri Banayi was called to the infamous Evin Prison for questioning, she decided to stay in Iran but only appeared as an extra in one feature film after the revolution.

Filmography

Personal life
She was engaged to Behrouz Vosughi, but they didn't get married and Vosughi married Googoosh, famous Iranian singer and actress. One of Banayi's sisters is Aki Banayi (Akram Banayi). She is a singer and lives in Los Angeles.

Notes

References

External links

Living people
1940 births
Iranian film actresses
People from Arak, Iran
20th-century Iranian actresses